Ruth Gledhill (born 1959) is an English journalist and is a former religion affairs correspondent for The Times, a post she left in 2014. Gledhill was the last full-time newspaper journalist dedicated to religious affairs in the UK. She is currently assistant editor, home and digital, of The Tablet.

Gledhill grew up in Gratwich, Staffordshire, a small village near Uttoxeter, as the daughter of the local vicar. She is married to Alan Franks, a writer for The Times and The Guardian, a playwright and musician. The couple have one son, Arthur.

Gledhill began her career in Uttoxeter with the Uttoxeter Advertiser and then moved to the Birmingham Post and Birmingham Evening Mail before joining the Daily Mail in 1984 and The Times in 1987; she became The Times religion correspondent in 1989.

She co-authored (with Tim Webb) a guide to Birmingham entitled Birmingham is not a Boring City. She also edited The Times Book of Prayers and The Times Book of Best Sermons, published for six years in connection with The Times Preacher of the Year Award.

Gledhill has argued in favour of the "benefits of schism" within the Anglican Communion, taking a critical stance against Peter Akinola and other church leaders with conservative views on homosexuality.

Gledhill has been shortlisted three times in the British Press Awards and won the Andrew Cross Award for Religious Writer of the Year in 2004

References

External links
Gledhill articles on the Journalisted website

1959 births
Living people
British journalists
People from Uttoxeter
British women journalists